The Kinzer Mound is a Native American mound in Ross County, Ohio, United States. Located outside of the village of South Salem, the mound sits on high ground far from any stream.

Due to the mound's location and shape, it is believed to have been built by people of the Adena culture.  If this is correct, the mound is likely to contain the remains of a wooden structure used for ceremonial purposes.  As such, it is a potential archaeological site.  In recognition of its prehistoric significance, the Kinzer Mound was listed on the National Register of Historic Places in 1974.

References

Adena culture
Archaeological sites on the National Register of Historic Places in Ohio
National Register of Historic Places in Ross County, Ohio
Mounds in Ohio